Jess E. Thompson (August 14, 1907 – January 26, 1975) was an American gridiron football, and basketball coach. He served three stints as the head football coach at Cameron University in Lawton, Oklahoma—1939 to 1941, in 1946, and 1951 to 1954—and at Centenary College of Louisiana in 1947. Thompson was also the head basketball coach at Mississippi Southern College—now known as the University of Southern Mississippi—from 1948 to 1949. He was assistant coach for the Calgary Stampeders of the Canadian Football League (CFL) for four seasons and also served as a scout for the Houston Oilers and New York Jets of the National Football League (NFL).

References

External links
 

1907 births
1975 deaths
Basketball coaches from Oklahoma
Cameron Aggies football coaches
Central Oklahoma Bronchos football coaches
Centenary Gentlemen football coaches
Southern Miss Golden Eagles basketball coaches
Southern Miss Golden Eagles football coaches
Calgary Stampeders coaches
Houston Oilers scouts
New York Jets scouts
Texas Tech Red Raiders football coaches
Tulsa Golden Hurricane football coaches
High school football coaches in Oklahoma
People from Cotton County, Oklahoma
Players of American football from Oklahoma